The Cemeteries Clauses Act 1847 (10 & 11 Vict c 65) is an Act of the Parliament of the United Kingdom.

Section 10 – Cemetery not to be within a certain distance of houses
This section was repealed by section 272(1) of, and Schedule 30 to, the Local Government Act 1972.

Section 58 –
This section was repealed by section 11(8) of, and Part II of the Schedule to, the Criminal Damage Act 1971.

Section 59 – Penalty on persons committing nuisances in the cemetery

Proposal for repeal

In 1985, the Law Commission said that this offence was no longer used and recommended that it be repealed.

Section 61 – Tender of amends
This section was repealed by the Statute Law Revision Act 1894.

Section 63 – In Ireland, part of penalty to be paid to Guardians of Unions
This section was repealed by the Statute Law Revision Act 1875.

Section 65 – Persons giving false evidence liable to penalties of perjury
This section was repealed, so far as it applied to England, by section 17 of, and the Schedule to the Perjury Act 1911.

Section 69 – Act may be amended, etc.
This section was repealed by the Statute Law Revision Act 1875.

See also
 Halsbury's Statutes

References

External links
 The Cemeteries Clauses Act 1847, as amended from the National Archives.
 The Cemeteries Clauses Act 1847, as originally enacted from the National Archives.

United Kingdom Acts of Parliament 1847
Cemeteries in the United Kingdom